Tung Wah Charity Show (Chinese: 歡樂滿東華) is a long-running charity television show raising funds for Tung Wah Group of Hospitals in Hong Kong which started in 1979. It is organised by Television Broadcasts Limited (TVB) annually on a Saturday or Sunday in December. It started from a charity show in the entertainment show Enjoy Yourself Tonight (EYT).

Unlike other charity shows on Hong Kong television, it runs during prime time until 12am (because evening news broadcast at this time). The show resumes immediately after the late news and ends at 2 am. The total amount of time on air is 6.5 hours. Cantonese opera is the core of the show. The master San Ma Shi Tsang was the famous one performed a section of Cantonese opera every years until his death in 1997 and was crowned as the king of charity singer (慈善伶王). Other performance like acrobats and singing has been seen on the show.

Many stunts performed in the charity show are record holder of Guinness World Records.

Various English translation of the show name:
Tung Wah Charity Gala 
Tung Wah Charity Show
Tung Wah Hospital Annual Charity Show
Tung Wah Hospitals Charity Evening
Tung Wah Night
Tung Wah Show

The Chinese name means Joy fills Tung Wah. In 1986, due to the death of former Hong Kong Governor Edward Youde from a heart attack in his office in Beijing, the Chinese name changed to 愛心滿東華 (lit. Love fills Tung Wah) since it was hardly any joy at that moment.

Although there are many TV charity shows following Tung Wah, they are hardly comparable to its influence on Hong Kong culture. Its name and its theme song is often deemed as the symbol of charity.

Program information

TVB original programming
1979 Hong Kong television series debuts
1970s Hong Kong television series
1980s Hong Kong television series
1990s Hong Kong television series
2000s Hong Kong television series
2010s Hong Kong television series
2020s Hong Kong television series
Tung Wah Group of Hospitals